Tomanija Đuričko (16 February 1914 – 31 January 1994) was a Serbian actress. She appeared in more than 70 films and television shows between 1955 and 1987. She starred in the 1967 film The Rats Woke Up, which won the Silver Bear for Best Director at the 17th Berlin International Film Festival.

Selected filmography
 The Rats Woke Up (1967)
 U raskoraku (1968)

References

External links

1914 births
1994 deaths
People from Šabac
Serbian film actresses
Serbian television actresses
20th-century Serbian actresses